Guillaume-René Meignan (12 April 1817 at Chauvigné, France – 20 January 1896 at Tours) was a French Catholic apologist and scriptural exegete, Archbishop of Tours and Cardinal.

Life
Having ascertained his vocation to the priesthood, on the completion of his academic studies at the Angers lycée and at Château-Gontier, he studied philosophy in the seminary of Le Mans, where he received the subdiaconate in 1839. From this institution he passed to the Collège de Tessé, which belonged to the Diocese of Le Mans, where, while teaching in one of the middle grades, he continued his own ecclesiastical studies.

The Abbé Bercy, an Orientalist of some distinction, whose notice he attracted at Le Mans and later at Tessé, advised him to make scriptural exegesis his special study. Jean-Baptiste Bouvier ordained him priest (14 June 1840) and sent him to Paris for a further course in philosophy under Victor Cousin. Meignan made the acquaintance of Ozanam, Montalembert, and others like them, who urged him to prepare for the controversial needs of the day by continuing his studies in Germany.

Following this advice, he became the pupil at Munich of such teachers as Joseph Görres, Ignaz von Döllinger, and Karl Joseph Hieronymus Windischmann; and when his earlier attraction for Scriptural studies was thoroughly reawakened under the stimulus of the then fresh Tübingen discussions, he repaired to Berlin where he attended the lectures of August Neander, Ernst Wilhelm Hengstenberg, and Friedrich Wilhelm Joseph Schelling.

In, or soon after May, 1843, Meignan returned to Paris to be numbered among the clergy of the archdiocese, but was soon (1845) obliged to visit Rome for the good of his health, which had become impaired. He seemed to recover immediately, and was able to follow his studies so successfully that he won a Doctorate of Theology at the Sapienza (March, 1846). Here again he was helped by the interest and advice of many eminent men, of Giovanni Perrone and Olympe-Philippe Gerbet, as well as by the teaching of Carlo Passaglia, Francis Xavier Patrizi, and Augustin Theiner. Between this period and 1861, when he became professor of Sacred Scripture at the Sorbonne, he filled various academical positions in the Archdiocese of Paris, of which Mgr Darboy made him vicar-general in 1863. In 1864 he was elevated to the Bishopric of Châlons, in 1882 transferred to the See of Arras, and in 1884 to the Archbishopric of Tours.

Works

He was one of the chief antagonists of Ernest Renan. He aimed to enlighten the lay mind on current topics of controversy and to supply his readers with the Christian point of view. His career as an apologist began as early as 1856 with the publication of "Les prophéties messianiques. Le Pentateuque" (Paris). In 1860 appeared "M. Renan réfuté par les rationalistes allemands" (Paris) and "Les Evangiles et la critique au XIXe siècle" (Paris); in 1886 "De l'irréligion systématique, ses influences actuelles" (Paris); in 1890 "Salomon, son règne, ses écrits" (Paris); in 1892 "Les prophètes d'Israël et le Messie, depuis Daniel jusqu'à Jean-Baptiste" (Paris).

He wrote many other works on kindred topics. His treatment of Messianic prophecy extends beyond mere verbal exegesis, and includes a critical examination of historical events and conditions. Like other great Catholic controversialists of his time, he had to suffer adverse criticisms; these were answered by Pope Leo XIII, who raised him to the cardinalate, 15 December 1892.

References

Boissonot, Le cardinal Meignan (Paris, 1899)

External links
Source

1817 births
1896 deaths
Bishops of Arras
Bishops of Châlons-sur-Marne
Archbishops of Tours
19th-century French cardinals
Cardinals created by Pope Leo XIII